List of Members of Parliament elected in the 1710 British general election, held in October of that year.

This is a list of the 558 MPs or Members of Parliament elected to the 314 constituencies of the Parliament of Great Britain in 1710, the 3rd  Parliament of Great Britain, and their replacements returned at subsequent by-elections, arranged by constituency.

The reference, in the constituency section of the table, to the numbers of seats in a constituency has no relevance except to make clear how many members were elected in a particular constituency. Peers of Ireland are differentiated from the holders of courtesy titles by including the succession number to the peerage, i.e. The 1st Earl of Upper Ossory is an Irish peer and Viscount Dupplin is the holder of a courtesy title.



By-elections 
List of Great Britain by-elections (1707–15)

See also
1710 British general election
List of parliaments of Great Britain
Unreformed House of Commons

References

 The House of Commons 1690–1715, eds. D. Hayton, E. Cruickshanks, and S. Handley (2002)

External links
 History of Parliament: Members 1690–1715
 History of Parliament: Constituencies 1690–1715

1708
1710
1710 in Great Britain
Lists of Members of the Parliament of Great Britain